Western Brown High School is a public high school located in Mount Orab, Ohio, in the southwestern part of the state.  It is the only high school in the Western Brown Local Schools District. The school mascot is the Bronco.

Notable alumni
Rodney J. McKinley - 15th Chief Master Sergeant of the Air Force.  Class of 1974.

References

External links
District Website

High schools in Brown County, Ohio
Public high schools in Ohio